Martin Štěpánek (born June 5, 1977 in Náchod, Czech Republic) is a world class freediver and record-holder.

Life and career
From 1984 to 1997 he was a competitive monofin swimmer (finswimmer) (distances 50m and 100m). Martin's academic background follows a degree in Forestry Engineering with advanced studies in Sports Biology at the Charles University in Prague, Czech Republic. After moving to the United States he became USA Certified as a Deep Sea and Saturation Commercial Diver in May 1999. In 2000 Martin met Douglas Peterson, who went on to become his freediving coach and mentor, guiding him to his first World Record in July 2001. Since then, Martin continued to set freediving world records annually up to his retirement from competitive freediving in 2012. He is now recognized as one of the pioneers of modern freediving education.

Martin was on hand during David Blaine's "Drowned Alive" stunt in Lincoln Center in May 2006. Blaine was attempting to hold his breath (known as "apnea") long enough to break the current world record of eight minutes, fifty-eight seconds.

Martin is the founder of Freediving Instructors International (F.I.I.) the largest freediving education agency in the United States. He is an advisory board member of DiveWise a non-profit organization dedicated to freediver education and safety and celebrity supporter of Oceana.

Official World Records by Martin Štěpánek

References

External links
 Freediving Instructors International
 Martin Štěpánek's 2011 World Record Challenge homepage
 Martin Štěpánek's homepage
 AIDA homologated world records, incl record history
 Current Freediving World Records
 Oceana

1977 births
Living people
Czech freedivers
People from Náchod
Sportspeople from the Hradec Králové Region